Lee Simonson (June 26, 1888, New York City – January 23, 1967, Yonkers) was an American architect painter, stage setting designer.

He acted as a stage set designer for the Washington Square Players (1915–1917). When it became the Theatre Guild in 1919, he became a stage setting staff of the theater.

Literary works 

“Skyscrapers for Art Museums” The American Mercury, August 1927, pages 399-404
"Minor Prophecies" New York, Harcourt and Brace, 1927
"The Stage Is Set", New York, Dover Publications, 1932
(with Theodore Komisarjevsky):  "Settings and Costumes of the Modern Stage" New York Studio Productions, 1933
Isaacs, Edith J.R., editor:  "Architecture for the New Theater" Lee Simonson:  "Theater Planning" New York Theater Arts, 1935
 Part of a lifetime:  Drawings and Designs 1919-1940, Duell, Sloan and Pearce, New York 1943
 The Art of Scenic Design; A Pictorial Analysis of Stage Setting and its relation to Theatrical Production, 1950

Exhibitions
"Modern American Design in Metal" Newark Museum March 19 - April 18, 1929 included Simonson, Donald Deskey and William Zorach
"International Exhibition of Theater Art", Museum of Modern Art, January 15- February 25, 1934, more than 700 drawings and models from 14 countries. After the MoMA venue, the exhibition traveled to Worcester, Providence, Pittsburgh, St. Louis, Chicago and Buffalo
Harvard Contemporary Art Society 1932, exhibition included Simonson, Bel Geddes, Robert Jones, Monsine, Ornslegger

References

External links

 http://www.britannica.com/eb/article-9067866
 Guide to Lee Simonson Papers at Houghton Library, Harvard University
 Lee Simonson Photographs, 1871-1937 [bulk 1915-1937], held by the Billy Rose Theatre Division, New York Public Library for the Performing Arts
 
 

20th-century American painters
American male painters
1888 births
1967 deaths
American scenic designers
20th-century American male artists